UK Black Pride (UKBP) is a black gay pride event in London that has taken place since 2005. It is Europe's largest celebration of African, Asian, Middle Eastern, Latin American and Caribbean heritage lesbian, gay, bisexual, transgender, and queer (LGBTQ) people attracting nearly 8,000 people annually.

Event co-founder Phyllis Akua Opoku-Gyimah, also known as Lady Phyll, is executive director.

History
UK Black Pride began in 2005 as a day trip to Southend-on-Sea by members of the online social network Black Lesbians in the UK (BLUK).

On Sunday 8 July 2018, approximately 7,500 people attended UK Black Pride at Vauxhall Pleasure Gardens.

Stonewall, Europe's largest LGBT rights charity, withdrew its support from the Pride in London festival in 2018, following concerns over the event's "lack of diversity". The charity instead partnered with UK Black Pride, agreed on a joint programme of work in 2019, including the appointment by Stonewall of a full-time member of staff to work with UK Black Pride and BAME community groups.

In July 2019, British Vogue published an interview with the UK Black Pride co-founder where she discussed the need for a black LGBT pride event in the UK.

See also
Pride in London
Black gay pride

References

External links 
 

2005 establishments in the United Kingdom
Pride parades in England
Festivals established in 2005
Black British culture
Annual events in London
LGBT culture in London